Paul Guenther (born November 22, 1971) is an American football coach who is a senior defensive assistant for the Minnesota Vikings of the National Football League (NFL). He previously served as the defensive coordinator for the Oakland/Las Vegas Raiders from 2018 to 2020 and the Cincinnati Bengals from 2014 to 2017. He was the head coach of Ursinus College from 1997 to 2000.

Coaching career

Washington Redskins
Guenther was hired by the Washington Redskins as an assistant coach in 2002.

Cincinnati Bengals
In 2005, Guenther was hired by the Cincinnati Bengals as an assistant coach. He served as a coach of other positions before being promoted to defensive coordinator on January 15, 2014 after Mike Zimmer left to become head coach of the Minnesota Vikings.

Oakland / Las Vegas Raiders
In 2018, Guenther was hired by the Oakland Raiders as their defensive coordinator serving under head coach Jon Gruden. On December 13, 2020, Guenther was fired by the Raiders following a 44–27 loss against the Indianapolis Colts.

Minnesota Vikings
On February 10, 2021, Guenther was hired by the Minnesota Vikings as a senior defensive assistant, reuniting with head coach Mike Zimmer, whom Guenther worked under when Zimmer was defensive coordinator in Cincinnati.

Head coaching record

College

References

1971 births
Living people
American football linebackers
Cincinnati Bengals coaches
Jacksonville Dolphins football coaches
Las Vegas Raiders coaches
McDaniel Green Terror football coaches
National Football League defensive coordinators
Oakland Raiders coaches
Ursinus Bears football coaches
Ursinus Bears football players
Washington Redskins coaches
People from Bucks County, Pennsylvania
Coaches of American football from Pennsylvania
Players of American football from Pennsylvania
Minnesota Vikings coaches